Emerald Lake State Park is a  state park in the town of Dorset, Vermont, United States,  north of the village of East Dorset, the park's mailing address. It is the home of  Emerald Lake, called such because of its emerald color.

Activities includes swimming, non-motorized boating, camping, fishing, hiking, picnicking, bicycling, wildlife watching, and winter sports.

Facilities include 67 campsites and 37 lean-tos, flush toilets, hot showers, and a dump station. There is a small beach with a snack bar and boat rental facilities, a picnic pavilion with two group grills and a smaller grill, other picnic tables, and a horseshoe pit.

There is a nature center, and park rangers offer interpretive programs including night hikes, campfire programs, amphibian explorations, and nature crafts and games.

The state has designated  as the Emerald Lake Natural Area, on a steep bank at the south end of the park. The old-growth forest here features hemlock, sugar maples and other hardwood species, and there are several trees of noteworthy age and size.

References

External links
 

State parks of Vermont
Dorset, Vermont
Protected areas of Bennington County, Vermont
Nature centers in Vermont
Lakes of Vermont
Landforms of Bennington County, Vermont
1960 establishments in Vermont